Varbergs BoIS FC is a Swedish football club located in Varberg, the main town of Varberg Municipality in Halland County.

Background

The club was formed at a meeting in the Varbergs Folkets Hus on 25 March 1925. The backbone of the new club was a group of men from the Haga district of Varberg who had previously started a football club named Haga Bollklubb.

Over the years several sports have been covered by the club but activities are now centred on football and wrestling. The new organisations Varbergs BoIS FC (football) and Varbergs BoIS BK (wrestling) work side by side under the "umbrella" of Varbergs BoIS.

Since their foundation Varbergs BoIS FC has participated mainly in the middle divisions of the Swedish football league system.  The club currently plays in Allsvenskan which is the top tier of Swedish football. They play their home matches at the Påskbergsvallen in Varberg and are well known for their distinctive green and black striped shirts.

Varbergs BoIS FC are affiliated to the Hallands Fotbollförbund. The club has an active youth section and girls football was introduced in 2008.

The club made their debut at the top level in the 2020 Allsvenskan.

Players

First-team squad

Out on loan

Season to season

Footnotes

References

External links
 Varbergs BoIS FC – Official website

Varberg
Football clubs in Halland County
Association football clubs established in 1925
1925 establishments in Sweden